Rajiv Gandhi College of Engineering, Research and Technology (RCERT), formerly Chandrapur Engineering College(CEC), is an engineering institute located in Chandrapur, Maharashtra, India. It is managed by the Sardar Patel Memorial Society(Trust). It is affiliated to Dr. Babasaheb Ambedkar Technological University.

History 
The college was established in 1983 by late Shri Shantaramji Potdukhe. It started with five branches and 180 seats. It now has 520 seats intake in seven branches and a postgraduate course in three branches. The college is accredited by NAAC, Banglore.

About 
More than a thousand kilometers from the capital of Maharashtra, Chandrapur is identified by the amalgamation of diverse cultures of conservation of environment and industrial development. Bestowed with rich natural resources, Chandrapur district also replete with dense forest and enviable biodiversity. The Tadoba-Andheri Tiger reserve puts Chandrapur on the environment conservation map whereas Magasysay award winner Late Baba Amte's work at Anandwan has given it international identity.

More than 35 years ago, it was the vision of Shri Shantaramji Potdukhe that transformed the educational profile of Chandrapur when he laid the foundation of technical education by starting Rajiv Gandhi College of Engineering, Research and Technology (formerly Chandrapur Engineering College ) in 1983. It was an humble beginning with 5 branches and 180 seats. It now has 520 intake in 7 branches and PG course in three disciplines. 

The excellent results are the academic balance sheets of college whereas Energy park, Industrial waste characterization, Fly ash utilisation centre and pollution analysis signify the socio-environmental commitment. Equipped with the academic vision of Shri Shantaramji Potdukhe, a team of highly qualified faculty members put together by progressive Principal Dr.Z.J.Khan, the college is proudly marching ahead on the path of academic excellence

Facilities 
Campus	41.18 Acres

Build Up Area	18396.33 sq.m

Library	Titles: 11390
Volumes: 55028
National Journal: 29
International Journal: 48
Multimedia PC : 10
Reading Room Capacity: 150
E Journal Subscription Paid Rs126944
Library Management Software

Drinking Water	Potable Water Supply and outlets for drinking water at strategic locations R.O Water Treatment plant 400 liters/hour Centralized drinking water facilities at 3 places in 46.25 sq.m area

Toilet Blocks	10

Electric Supply	125 KVA Generator in 108.68 sq.m area

Computers & Computing Facility	No of PCs: 560
No of Legal System Software: 17
No of Legal Application Software: 45
LAN: yes
Internet Bandwidth: 10 Mbit/s
No of Printers: 31

College Canteen	Canteen 1:122.5 Sq.m
Canteen 2: 20.91 Sq.m

Hostels - 
Hostel	Girls Hostel: 2385.71 sq. m for 200 girls
Boys Hostel: 3243.6 sq. m for 350 Boys
TV room for Boys hostel students: 36.55 Sq.m

Playgrounds	
Cricket, Football & Volleyball: 12500 Sq.m area
Basket Ball Court:198.5 sq.m
Badminton and Skating: 301.2 Sq.m

Sport Facilities	
Gymnasium (Boys and Girls Separately): 168.83 Sq.m
TT Hall (Boys and Girls Separately): 40.56 Sq.m

Guest House : 335.12 sq.m

Laboratories: 74

Health care facilities	
Mediclaim facility for Staff 
Ambulance

Other facilities	
Auditorium: 442.02 Sq. m
Open Stage: 132.5 Sq.m
Lawn: 3950 Sq.m

Courses 
The Undergraduate courses offered by the college are:
 B. Tech.- Civil Engineering (Intake:60)
 B.Tech. - Computer Science and Engineering (Intake:120)
 B.Tech. - Electronics and Communication Engineering (Intake:60)
 B.Tech. - Electrical Engineering  (Intake:60)
 B.Tech. - Mechanical Engineering (Intake:90)
 B.Tech. - Mining Engineering (Intake:60)

The Postgraduate courses offered by the college are: 
 M.Tech. (Computer Science & Engg.) (Intake:18)
 M.Tech. (Energy Management System) (Intake:18)
 M.Tech. (CAD/CAM) (Intake:18)

The Doctoral Courses (Ph.D.) offered by the college in various Subjects are:
 Civil Engineering
 Electrical Engineering
 Mechanical Engineering
 Mining Engineering
 Electronics Engineering
 Applied Chemistry
 Applied Physics
 Applied Mathematics

Admissions 
Admission criteria are based on the MHT-CET / JEE-Main rankings. The online admission enquiry can be made from the link https://docs.google.com/forms/d/e/1FAIpQLSfAetOhzQIXaEmRCW-V11gY8i7UrlEuhWKHO4ZjreH-OaW2bg/viewform?c=0&w=1

Library 
The library has attained membership of DELNET (Developing Library Network) which enables students/staff to access the books/journals of the libraries of hundreds of colleges including NT. They can also avail themselves of the ILL (Inter Library Loan) facility to borrow books from other colleges libraries. The digital library facility gives access to journals for research. The IEEE journals and papers are also available to be downloaded as e-resources. The library features a 'book bank' facility which is partly funded by the State Government. It enables a student to hire a complete set of books for a given year for a nominal rent. SC/ST students are provided books free of cost. There is a reading room for books . The library also has a section of reference books and Periodicals/Journals. The library is well automated.

Training and Placement 
A large number of companies visit the campus every year and recruit eligible students from the campus. For details please click on http://www.rcert.ac.in/index.php?option=commonpage&RID=415&depid=22

Professional Affiliations 
The college is a member of the Indian Society for Technical Education (ISTE) and of the Institution of Engineers (IEI).

References

External links  
 

Engineering colleges in Maharashtra
Chandrapur
Educational institutions established in 1983
1983 establishments in Maharashtra